Ramila Shahvalad qizi Yusubova (born 28 July 1989, in Tbilisi) is an Azerbaijani judoka. At the 2012 Summer Olympics she competed in the Women's 63 kg, but was defeated in the second round.

References

External links
 
 

Azerbaijani female judoka
1989 births
Living people
Olympic judoka of Azerbaijan
Judoka at the 2012 Summer Olympics
Sportspeople from Tbilisi
Georgian Azerbaijanis
20th-century Azerbaijani women
21st-century Azerbaijani women